FIAMM Energy Technology is a multinational company engaged in the production and distribution of batteries and accumulators for motor vehicles and for industrial use, born following the separation from FIAMM Group of the business of automotive batteries and industrial batteries with lead-acid technology.

History
The company was founded in 1942 as FIAMM (Fabbrica Italiana Accumulatori Motocarri Montecchio). The production focused on electric traction and automotive starter batteries.

In 1950 FIAMM exhibited in motor shows together with the major car manufacturers. A FIAMM battery was fitted in the Ferrari that won the Mille Miglia race in 1950. The first OE supply for a major brand was for Innocenti's Lambretta.

In the 1970s, FIAMM became an OEM for the most important European car manufacturers. In the stationary battery sector, the company could boast major operators such as SIP and Enel among its customers.

Since 1980 the company exported stationary batteries to the USA and entered the two main European markets with FIAMM Germany and FIAMM France. It continued to present itself in the world of sports in Rally, F1, Formula Indy, Paris Dakar and Offshore.

In the 1990s, the Company appointed a new generation of professional management.

In the 2000s there was the opening of new plants abroad, acquisition of multiple battery distributors across Europe and significant investments in technology.

In 2015, a Korean partner for OLED was identified. On November 28, 2016, an agreement was signed for an Italian-Japanese joint venture with Hitachi Ltd.; in February 2017 FIAMM Energy Technology (FET) was formed, with 51% in the hands of the Japanese Hitachi Chemical group with an operation of 86 million euros (52 million paid by Hitachi and another 34 for the increase of capital of the new FET). President became Misao Nakagawa, CEO Yasuhiko Nakayama. 49% remained in the FIAMM Group.

In 2017 Hitachi Chemical acquired the 51% of the shares of FIAMM Energy Technology S.p.A.

In 2020 Showa Denko acquired 100% of Hitachi Chemical's shares which from October 1 changes its name to Showa Denko Materials Co.

References

Electric power companies of Italy
Automotive companies established in 1942
Italian brands
Motor vehicle battery manufacturers
Italian companies established in 1942